Zahid Hasan Ameli (born 25 December 1987) is a Bangladeshi footballer who plays as a striker for Brothers Union and the Bangladesh national team. He is the current second top scorer of the Bangladesh national football team and also has the third highest caps.

Club career
From 2007 to 2009, Ameli played for Dhaka side Abahani Limited where he scored a total of 25 league goals, helping the club win back-to-back B. League titles. He then moved to another Dhaka side, Mohammedan Sport Club for the 2009–10 season where he scored 18 goals as the club finished league runners-up. Before the start of the 2010–11 season, he transferred to Sheikh Jamal Dhanmondi Club. They eventually won the league title. Later he joined Muktijoddha Sangsad KS in 2011–12 season; his team became Premier League runner-up. He joined Sheikh Russel KC in 2012 and led his team to Federation Cup (Bangladesh) title by scoring 8 goals in the tournament.

International goals
Scores and results list Bangladesh's goal tally first.

Honours
Brothers Union

 Dhaka League
2003-04,2005
 National Football Championship:2004
 Federation Cup:
2005
 Bordoloi Trophy:2004

Abahani Limited 
 Bangladesh Premier League: 2007, 2008–09
Mohammedan SC
 Federation Cup:2009
 Super Cup:2009
 Independence Cup:2013-14
Sheikh Russel KC
 Bangladesh Premier League:2012–13
 Federation Cup:2012
 Independence Cup:2012–13
Sheikh Jamal Dhanmondi Club
 Bangladesh Premier League:2010–11
Chittagong Abahani
 Sheikh Kamal International Club Cup: 2015
 Independence Cup:2016
Bangladesh U-23
South Asian Games:
Gold medal (1):  2010

References

External links

 

1987 births
Living people
Bangladeshi footballers
Bangladeshi photographers
Bangladesh international footballers
Bangladesh youth international footballers
Association football forwards
Abahani Limited (Dhaka) players
Mohammedan SC (Dhaka) players
Sheikh Russel KC players
Brothers Union players
Sheikh Jamal Dhanmondi Club players
Muktijoddha Sangsad KC players
People from Pirojpur District
Footballers at the 2006 Asian Games
Footballers at the 2010 Asian Games
Asian Games competitors for Bangladesh
South Asian Games gold medalists for Bangladesh
South Asian Games bronze medalists for Bangladesh
South Asian Games medalists in football